The Balakovo Constituency (No.164) is a Russian legislative constituency in the Saratov Oblast. The constituency comprises the western part of Saratov Oblast, stretching from the Kazakh border to the city of Saratov.

Members elected

Election results

1993

|-
! colspan=2 style="background-color:#E9E9E9;text-align:left;vertical-align:top;" |Candidate
! style="background-color:#E9E9E9;text-align:left;vertical-align:top;" |Party
! style="background-color:#E9E9E9;text-align:right;" |Votes
! style="background-color:#E9E9E9;text-align:right;" |%
|-
|style="background-color: " |
|align=left|Aleksandr Sergeenkov
|align=left|Independent
|56,285
|18.09%
|-
|style="background-color: " |
|align=left|Aleksey Ulyankin
|align=left|Independent
| -
|18.04%
|-
| colspan="5" style="background-color:#E9E9E9;"|
|- style="font-weight:bold"
| colspan="3" style="text-align:left;" | Total
| 311,219
| 100%
|-
| colspan="5" style="background-color:#E9E9E9;"|
|- style="font-weight:bold"
| colspan="4" |Source:
|
|}

1995

|-
! colspan=2 style="background-color:#E9E9E9;text-align:left;vertical-align:top;" |Candidate
! style="background-color:#E9E9E9;text-align:left;vertical-align:top;" |Party
! style="background-color:#E9E9E9;text-align:right;" |Votes
! style="background-color:#E9E9E9;text-align:right;" |%
|-
|style="background-color: " |
|align=left|Aleksandr Maksakov
|align=left|Communist Party
|97,030
|25.79%
|-
|style="background-color:"|
|align=left|Dmitry Matveev
|align=left|Liberal Democratic Party
|80,869
|21.49%
|-
|style="background-color:#D50000"|
|align=left|Viktor Anpilov
|align=left|Communists and Working Russia - for the Soviet Union
|38,864
|10.33%
|-
|style="background-color:"|
|align=left|Aleksandr Tsaryov
|align=left|Agrarian Party
|32,182
|8.55%
|-
|style="background-color:#23238E"|
|align=left|Igor Nikiforov
|align=left|Our Home – Russia
|19,178
|5.10%
|-
|style="background-color:#1C1A0D"|
|align=left|Igor Yevtushevsky
|align=left|Forward, Russia!
|18,311
|4.87%
|-
|style="background-color: " |
|align=left|Aleksandr Sergeenkov (incumbent)
|align=left|Independent
|16,707
|4.44%
|-
|style="background-color: " |
|align=left|Vladimir Solovyov
|align=left|Independent
|12,658
|3.36%
|-
|style="background-color: " |
|align=left|Pyotr Novikov
|align=left|Independent
|10,934
|2.91%
|-
|style="background-color:#DD137B"|
|align=left|Aleksandr Kiselyov
|align=left|Social Democrats
|10,282
|2.73%
|-
|style="background-color: " |
|align=left|Yuri Sulantyev
|align=left|Independent
|5,701
|1.52%
|-
|style="background-color:#000000"|
|colspan=2 |against all
|28,746
|7.64%
|-
| colspan="5" style="background-color:#E9E9E9;"|
|- style="font-weight:bold"
| colspan="3" style="text-align:left;" | Total
| 376,232
| 100%
|-
| colspan="5" style="background-color:#E9E9E9;"|
|- style="font-weight:bold"
| colspan="4" |Source:
|
|}

1998

|-
! colspan=2 style="background-color:#E9E9E9;text-align:left;vertical-align:top;" |Candidate
! style="background-color:#E9E9E9;text-align:left;vertical-align:top;" |Party
! style="background-color:#E9E9E9;text-align:right;" |Votes
! style="background-color:#E9E9E9;text-align:right;" |%
|-
|style="background-color:"|
|align=left|Nikolay Sukhoy
|align=left|Agrarian Party
|171,696
|70.48%
|-
| colspan="5" style="background-color:#E9E9E9;"|
|- style="font-weight:bold"
| colspan="3" style="text-align:left;" | Total
| 243,610
| 100%
|-
| colspan="5" style="background-color:#E9E9E9;"|
|- style="font-weight:bold"
| colspan="4" |Source:
|
|}

1999

|-
! colspan=2 style="background-color:#E9E9E9;text-align:left;vertical-align:top;" |Candidate
! style="background-color:#E9E9E9;text-align:left;vertical-align:top;" |Party
! style="background-color:#E9E9E9;text-align:right;" |Votes
! style="background-color:#E9E9E9;text-align:right;" |%
|-
|style="background-color:#3B9EDF"|
|align=left|Nikolay Sukhoy (incumbent)
|align=left|Fatherland – All Russia
|144,352
|38.99%
|-
|style="background-color:"|
|align=left|Gennady Gamayunov
|align=left|Communist Party
|78,061
|21.09%
|-
|style="background-color:#E32322"|
|align=left|Anatoly Kalashnikov
|align=left|Stalin Bloc – For the USSR
|31,141
|8.41%
|-
|style="background-color:"|
|align=left|Galina Startseva
|align=left|Yabloko
|24,663
|6.66%
|-
|style="background-color: " |
|align=left|Sergey Semyonov
|align=left|Independent
|22,347
|6.04%
|-
|style="background-color:#D50000"|
|align=left|Lyudmila Paderina
|align=left|Communists and Workers of Russia - for the Soviet Union
|16,068
|4.34%
|-
|style="background-color:#000000"|
|colspan=2 |against all
|47,586
|12.85%
|-
| colspan="5" style="background-color:#E9E9E9;"|
|- style="font-weight:bold"
| colspan="3" style="text-align:left;" | Total
| 370,193
| 100%
|-
| colspan="5" style="background-color:#E9E9E9;"|
|- style="font-weight:bold"
| colspan="4" |Source:
|
|}

2003

|-
! colspan=2 style="background-color:#E9E9E9;text-align:left;vertical-align:top;" |Candidate
! style="background-color:#E9E9E9;text-align:left;vertical-align:top;" |Party
! style="background-color:#E9E9E9;text-align:right;" |Votes
! style="background-color:#E9E9E9;text-align:right;" |%
|-
|style="background-color: "|
|align=left|Vyacheslav Volodin
|align=left|United Russia
|283,613
|81.75%
|-
|style="background-color:"|
|align=left|Olga Alimova
|align=left|Communist Party
|32,692
|9.42%
|-
|style="background-color:"|
|align=left|Aleksandr Tagunov
|align=left|Liberal Democratic Party
|4,228
|1.22%
|-
|style="background-color:#1042A5"|
|align=left|Vladimir Smirnov
|align=left|Union of Right Forces
|4,013
|1.16%
|-
|style="background-color:"|
|align=left|Ivan Bolshakov
|align=left|Yabloko
|2,575
|0.74%
|-
|style="background-color: " |
|align=left|Yuri Graf
|align=left|Independent
|1,015
|0.29%
|-
|style="background-color:#14589F"|
|align=left|Natalya Karaman
|align=left|Development of Enterprise
|862
|0.25%
|-
|style="background-color:#164C8C"|
|align=left|Vyacheslav Smirnov
|align=left|United Russian Party Rus'
|683
|0.20%
|-
|style="background-color: " |
|align=left|Yevgeny Chirkov
|align=left|Independent
|483
|0.14%
|-
|style="background-color:#000000"|
|colspan=2 |against all
|13,401
|3.86%
|-
| colspan="5" style="background-color:#E9E9E9;"|
|- style="font-weight:bold"
| colspan="3" style="text-align:left;" | Total
| 347,112
| 100%
|-
| colspan="5" style="background-color:#E9E9E9;"|
|- style="font-weight:bold"
| colspan="4" |Source:
|
|}

2016

|-
! colspan=2 style="background-color:#E9E9E9;text-align:left;vertical-align:top;" |Candidate
! style="background-color:#E9E9E9;text-align:left;vertical-align:top;" |Party
! style="background-color:#E9E9E9;text-align:right;" |Votes
! style="background-color:#E9E9E9;text-align:right;" |%
|-
|style="background-color: " |
|align=left|Nikolay Pankov
|align=left|United Russia
|187,489
|65.79%
|-
|style="background-color:"|
|align=left|Sergey Ashikhmin
|align=left|Liberal Democratic Party
|24,488
|8.59%
|-
|style="background-color:"|
|align=left|Olga Lubkova
|align=left|Communist Party
|22,446
|7.88%
|-
|style="background-color:"|
|align=left|Mikhail Dementyev
|align=left|A Just Russia
|11,870
|4.17%
|-
|style="background:#D71A21;"|
|align=left|Aleksandr German
|align=left|Communists of Russia
|9,318
|3.27%
|-
|style="background-color:"|
|align=left|Vladimir Deryabin
|align=left|Party of Growth
|6,020
|2.11%
|-
|style="background-color:"|
|align=left|Aleksandr Yermishin
|align=left|Yabloko
|4,292
|1.51%
|-
|style="background-color:"|
|align=left|Roman Maltsev
|align=left|People's Freedom Party
|3,755
|1.32%
|-
|style="background:#00A650;"|
|align=left|Natalia Frolova
|align=left|Civilian Power
|3,018
|1.06%
|-
|style="background-color:"|
|align=left|Gleb Terekhin
|align=left|Rodina
|2,491
|0.87%
|-
|style="background-color:"|
|align=left|Alisa Trishchanovich
|align=left|The Greens
|2,052
|0.72%
|-
|style="background-color:"|
|align=left|Maksim Smirnov
|align=left|Civic Platform
|1,559
|0.55%
|-
| colspan="5" style="background-color:#E9E9E9;"|
|- style="font-weight:bold"
| colspan="3" style="text-align:left;" | Total
| 284,987
| 100%
|-
| colspan="5" style="background-color:#E9E9E9;"|
|- style="font-weight:bold"
| colspan="4" |Source:
|
|}

2021

|-
! colspan=2 style="background-color:#E9E9E9;text-align:left;vertical-align:top;" |Candidate
! style="background-color:#E9E9E9;text-align:left;vertical-align:top;" |Party
! style="background-color:#E9E9E9;text-align:right;" |Votes
! style="background-color:#E9E9E9;text-align:right;" |%
|-
|style="background-color: " |
|align=left|Nikolay Pankov (incumbent)
|align=left|United Russia
|182,223
|63.07%
|-
|style="background-color: " |
|align=left|Vladimir Yesipov
|align=left|Communist Party
|38,794
|13.43%
|-
|style="background-color: " |
|align=left|Svetlana Berezina
|align=left|A Just Russia — For Truth
|18,094
|6.26%
|-
|style="background-color: " |
|align=left|Aleksandra Gryakova
|align=left|Communists of Russia
|14,404
|4.99%
|-
|style="background-color: "|
|align=left|Andrey Zobnin
|align=left|New People
|10,115
|3.50%
|-
|style="background-color: " |
|align=left|Natalya Karaman
|align=left|Yabloko
|7,140
|2.47%
|-
|style="background-color: " |
|align=left|Maksim Ramikh
|align=left|Liberal Democratic Party
|6,772
|2.34%
|-
|style="background-color: "|
|align=left|Aleksandr Urmanbaev
|align=left|Rodina
|2,783
|0.96%
|-
| colspan="5" style="background-color:#E9E9E9;"|
|- style="font-weight:bold"
| colspan="3" style="text-align:left;" | Total
| 288,933
| 100%
|-
| colspan="5" style="background-color:#E9E9E9;"|
|- style="font-weight:bold"
| colspan="4" |Source:
|
|}

Notes

Sources
164. Балаковский одномандатный избирательный округ

References

Russian legislative constituencies
Politics of Saratov Oblast